The 2020 LFA season was the fifth season of the Liga de Fútbol Americano Profesional (LFA), the top American football league in Mexico. The regular season began on February 8 and was to conclude on April 26, with the playoffs beginning on May 1 and ending with the Tazón México V on May 17. Nevertheless, after week 5, on March 16, the LFA announced the suspension of the 2020 season due to the COVID-19 pandemic and on 29 March 2020 the league confirmed that the season was cancelled.

Preseason events

Expansion and stadium changes
One new team joined the league: Pioneros, based in Querétaro City. Due to Pioneros joining the LFA and the league failing to secure a tenth expansion team, thus raising the number of teams to nine, the LFA took the decision that the Mayas would not participate in the season, returning in 2021. This decision was also made taking in consideration the change of ownership in the team.

Four teams switched stadiums:
Artilleros, previously playing at Estadio Templo del Dolor (with capacity of 4,500 spectators), moved to the Estadio Universitario BUAP, that can accommodate 19,283 spectators. The stadium, originally built from 1997 to 1999, was renovated in 2012 and used to host Lobos BUAP, Liga MX matches until 2019, when the club was dissolved.
Fundidores moved to Estadio Borregos, with a capacity of 10,057 spectators. The stadium is owned by the Monterrey Institute of Technology and Higher Education and it is used by college football team Borregos Salvajes Monterrey. Before, Fundidores played at the Estadio Nuevo León Unido, that could only accommodate 1,500 people.
Mexicas, formerly playing at Casco de Santo Tomás Field (with capacity of 2,000 spectators), moved to the Estadio Perros Negros in Naucalpan. The stadium can accommodate 2,500 spectators.
Raptors, previously playing at FES Acatlán (with capacity of 2,500 spectators), moved to the Estadio José Ortega Martínez, with a capacity of 3,700 seated spectators. The team already played at the stadium during the 2018 season.

Coaching changes
Fundidores: Carlos Strevel replaced Israel González as head coach of the team. González previously coached the team for two seasons (2018 and 2019) reaching playoffs once.
Mexicas: Héctor Toxqui was chosen to replace Enrique Zárate as head coach of the team. As of the 2020 season, Mexicas is the only team in the league to have had a different coach for each one of its five seasons.

Draft
The 2020 draft was the largest so far, declaring more than 70 senior players from ONEFA, CONADEIP and FADEMAC for the first time. The draft was held on January 11 at the FES Acatlán facilities.

*In exchange for draft selection in the Mayan draft, Dinos gave Fundidores selections in the second, third, fourth, and fifth round of the 2020 draft.
** In exchange for WR Aldo Narvaes and Josep Acosta, Pioneers gave Mexica selections in the fourth and fifth round of the 2020 draft.
*** In exchange for Mayan draft picks, Osos gave Raptors selections in the fourth, sixth, and seventh round of the 2020 draft.

Mayas draft
For the 2020 season, the 8 teams of the LFA made a draft of the Mayas' players who declared themselves eligible to play the 2020 season with some other team in the league, with the intention to continue playing and not lose the pace of competition. Artilleros declined participation by arguing not to be interested in any Mayas' players.

*He declined his hiring for labor reasons
|
**Hired by the Raptors

Teams

Season structure
The training camp began in the first week of November 2019, some teams started early, as the case of Condors and Dinos that began at the end of October. The regular season is played from February to April. Each team faces each of the teams of their respective division twice, once at home and once as a visitor. There will also be 4 games between conferences, each team will have two home games and two visiting. There will be three bye weeks: one between week 5 and 6 and also for teams that enter playoffs between week 10 and the conference finals, and one week before the Tazón México V.

Suspension
On March 16, after Week 5, the league announced the indefinite suspension of the season due to the COVID-19 pandemic. It was informed that none of the eight team players were affected by the virus. It was also announced that all the foreign players participating in the league as part of the LFA-CFL agreement would return immediately to their countries.

Cancellation
On April 29, Alejandro Jaimes, the LFA commissioner, announced that the season would be cancelled and that the league would return until 2021.

Regular season

Standings
Note: GP = Games played, W = Wins, L = Losses, PF = Points for, PA = Points against

Results

References

LFA
LFA
LFA seasons
LFA